San Paulo de Río Barba is a parish of the municipality of O Vicedo, Galicia, Spain.

It is composed of the following places:
 Abezan
 A Cova
 A Forqueta
  Insua
 A Pardiñeira
 A Sanga
 As Mangas
 Cortellas
 Espido
 Espigueiras
 Golpeiras
 Maladas
 O Canto de Muro
 O Chao
 O Monte dos Bois
 O Porto
 O Regal
 O Rego
 O Rego dos Bois
 O Tellado
 O Vilar
 Os Sirgos
 Os Navallos

Parishes of Galicia (Spain)